Caesium nitrate or cesium nitrate is a salt with the chemical formula CsNO3. An alkali metal nitrate, it is used in pyrotechnic compositions, as a colorant and an oxidizer, e.g. in decoys and illumination flares. The caesium emissions are chiefly due to two powerful spectral lines at 852.113 nm and 894.347 nm.

Caesium nitrate prisms are used in infrared spectroscopy, in x-ray phosphors, and in scintillation counters. It is also used in making optical glasses and lenses.

As with other alkali metal nitrates, caesium nitrate decomposes on gentle heating to give caesium nitrite:
2 CsNO3 → 2 CsNO2 + O2

Caesium also forms two unusual acid nitrates, which can be described as CsNO3·HNO3 and CsNO3·2HNO3 (melting points 100 °C and 36–38 °C respectively).

References

Caesium compounds
Nitrates
Pyrotechnic oxidizers
Pyrotechnic colorants